The 1985–86 Navy Midshipmen men's basketball team represented the United States Naval Academy during the 1985–86 NCAA Division I men's basketball season. The Midshipmen were led by sixth-year head coach Paul Evans, and played their home games at Halsey Field House in Annapolis, Maryland as members of the Colonial Athletic Association.

Behind Consensus Second-Team All-American David Robinson, the team won the CAA regular-season (13-1) and conference tournament titles, made a run to the Elite Eight of the NCAA tournament, and finished with an overall record of 30-5.

Roster

Schedule and results

|-
!colspan=9 style=| Non-conference regular season

|-
!colspan=9 style=| CAA regular season

|-
!colspan=9 style=| CAA tournament

|-
!colspan=9 style=| NCAA tournament

Source

Rankings

Awards and honors
 David Robinson – CAA Player of the Year (2), Consensus Second-Team All-American, NCAA records for blocked shots in a game (14) and season (207), National leader in rebounds (13.0) and blocked shots (5.9) per game

References

Navy Midshipmen
Navy
Navy Midshipmen men's basketball seasons
Navy
Navy